Swann is a lunar impact crater that is located on the far side of the Moon, to the southeast of the prominent crater Compton. This is a heavily worn and battered formation that is now scarcely recognizable as a crater. The terrain along the rim and the interior resembles the surrounding surface, being marked by secondary craters from Compton. To the north and northeast of Swann are two younger, bowl-shaped craters, Swann A and Swann C, with sharp-edged rims that have not received significantly wear.

Satellite craters
By convention these features are identified on lunar maps by placing the letter on the side of the crater midpoint that is closest to Swann.

References

 
 
 
 
 
 
 
 
 
 
 
 

Impact craters on the Moon